Harburger TB 1865 is a German sports club in Heimfeld, Hamburg, Germany.

History 

Harburg TB was founded on September 6, 1865 through the merger of Harburg Turnerschaft 1858 and Männerturnvereins 1861 Harburg. In 1883, Männer Turnverein 1883 Harburg (MTV 1883) split from the club. FC Schwarz-Weiß 1924 Harburg then split off from Harburg TB as well. In 1907, Harburg TB acquired their field, the Jahnhöhe.

Walter Risse was hired to the manage the club after the 1948-49 season as the team were getting ready to play in the first division for the first time. He helped lead the club to a big win over Itzehoer SV, in front of 20,000 fans. Thanks to a donor, the team was able to improve their facilities and built their first locker room at this time. Harburg's Jahnhöhe field was not suitable for the first division though and the team had to play in Viktoria Harburg's, Stadion Winsener Straße field instead. Harburg's first season in the top division was unsuccessful as the team came in last place and were demoted.

The team lost many players due to its demotion but re-built and headed back to the Oberliga Nord for the 1952-53 season. They had to play at Stadion Winsener Straße again, but were able to avoid demotion and gained some increased fan support. The team was then relegated from the Oberliga Nord in 1954-55, and has not seen first division play since. The team came close in 1956, 1959, 1960 and 1961 but lost in the promotion playoffs.

They won the Amateurliga Hamburg in 1960-61 but had dropped to the 3rd division in 1963-64 due to the creation of the Bundesliga. The team nearly merged with Turnerschaft Harburg to create a team called SC Phoenix von 1865, but the merge was cancelled.

The club was demoted to the 5th division by the 1974-75 season. The football section of the club started receiving less funding and the team could not get past the 4th and 5th divisions. The team withdrew from the Oberliga in 2000 and by 2003, had chosen to compete in the 8th division. The club renovated their facilities in 2008 and renamed their field, the Sportpark Jahnhöhe.

Other information 

Harburger TB has been featured in the video game series, Football Manager, since 2014.

Season results 

The club's football and gymnastic teams split in 1923-24. Soccer players from HTB formed MTV Harburg and soccer players who remained with HTB competed as "Schwarz-Weiss Harburg" and also played in the league. After 7 games, Schwarz-Weiss Harburg rejoined HTB. HTB then rejoined the Norddeutschen Fubball-Verband and they merged with SV Harburg.

Managers

Notable personnel 

 Walter Risse - He managed the club from 1949-50 and played for the Germany national team.

 Igor Matanović - He played for Harburger prior to 2010 and played Germany national team as a youth player. 

 Reagy Ofosu - He played for the club as a youth player from 1999-2005.

 Edmund Adamkiewicz - He played for the club from 1953-55 and played for the German national team. 

 Jens Paeslack - He played for the club from 1995-96 and later played for Karlsruher SC.

Jurgen Neudorf - He played for the club from 1959-1961 and appeared for the  German youth national football team.

 Paul Weber - He played for the club's 1948-49 Oberliga promotion team and continued to play with the club until the age of 40. He later coached the youth and men's teams, winning the amateur league and the DFB Landerpokal.

 Hans Franke - He played for FC St. Pauli and 1. FC Kaiserslautern then later was the captain of HTB. He held the record for the most games played and the most goals scored at HTB and played an important role in HTB's 1949 and 1952 championships.

 Heinrich Nodof - He played for the 1941 and 1949 championship teams, then later became a trainer and a groundskeeper for the club. 

 Otmar Sommerfeld - He was part of the 1948-49 championship team and made 362 appearances in the Oberliga Nord, which was a record. He later played for FC St. Pauli.

 Horst Willumeit - He was a goalkeeper and helped the team win the 1960-61 Amateurliga Hamburg and the 1981 Harburg-Pokal. He also helped Hamburg win the  1961 Länderpokal.

 Horst Michalke - He was part of the 1960-61 Amateurliga Hamburg championship team and later as a trainer helped the team win the 1981 Harburg-Pokal.

 Werner Menk - He helped the team win the 1961 title then helped the city of Hamburg win the 1961 Länderpokal. He later played on the 1976 Harburg-Pokal championship team.

 Udo Padikow - He helped HTB reach the 1960 Hamburg Cup finals and helped North Germany win the 1961 DFB-Jugend-Länderpokal. He played more than 500 games with HTB and was the captain from 1968-73.

 Ulrich Fastert - He was part of the Hamburg amateur team and helped HTB win the 1976 Harburg-Pokal and the 1976-77 Amateur Hamburg Hammonia-Staffel.

 Uwe Ozekker - He helped the team win the 1976, 1981 and 1983 Harburg-Pokal's along with the 1977 Amateur Hamburg Hammonia-Staffel.

Honors 

2. Klasse Hamburg Staffel G
Champions: 1941-42
Verbandsliga Hamburg Elbe-Staffel
Champions: 1948-49
Amateurliga Hamburg
Champions: 1951-52, 1960-61
Amateur Hamburg Hammonia-Staffel
Champions:1976-77
Harburg-Pokal
Champions:1976, 1981, 1983
Verbandsliga Hamburg
Champions:2002-03

References

External links 

Official Website
Other Official Website

1865 establishments in Germany
Association football clubs established in 1865
Football clubs in Hamburg
Hamburg
Sports clubs
Football clubs in Germany